The 2004 Milwaukee mayoral election was held on Tuesday, April 6, 2004, to elect the mayor for Milwaukee. Tom Barrett defeated incumbent acting mayor Marvin Pratt. This election coincided with other municipal elections.

Municipal elections in Wisconsin are non-partisan.

Primary election

Results

General election

Results

References

2004 Wisconsin elections
Milwaukee
2004
Government of Milwaukee